Alexandre Jallier (born June 16, 1992 in Paris) is a French basketball player.

He started his career with in the French top-tier LNB Pro A with Paris-Levallois during the 2012-2013 season. The following season he signed with UB Chartres Métropole. In 2014, Jallier signed with Étoile Charleville-Mézières in the LNB Pro B.

In 2015, he signed with Paris Basket Avenir of the NM2 and in 2016, Jallier joined JS Marzy.

References

External links
LNB profile
Profile at Eurobasket.com
Profile at Proballers.com
Statistics at frenchbasketballscouting.fr

1992 births
Living people
French men's basketball players
Metropolitans 92 players
Shooting guards
Basketball players from Paris